The Eritini are a small tribe of the Satyrinae in the Nymphalidae (brush-footed butterfly) family. This group contains a mere two genera.

References

Satyrinae
Butterfly tribes
Taxa described in 1968